Lady Eveline Marie Alexander (16 April 1821 – 1906) was a British/Canadian self-taught artist.

Biography
Alexander née Michell was born on 16 April 1821 in Nantes, France. Her father was Colonel Charles Collier Michell, who was born on 29 March 1793 in Exeter, Devon. Her mother was Anne D'Arragon, who was born in Spain in 1799. She was promptly born after her parents got married on 17 September 1814. Her father, was a member of the Royal Artillery.

While there is little known about Lady Eveline Marie Alexander, she is now well known for being an amateur painter whose primary skills were in oil and watercolor. The exact way she learned how to paint is still unknown. She had no official training, it is believed she learned from her father, who was a military drawing master at Royal Military College.

In 1837, she married Sir James Edward Alexander and the couple had five children.

She accompanied her military husband on a Canadian tour of duty from 1841 to 1849, when she settled in London, Ontario. In 1843 she painted a scene of a military steeple chase, which was turned into a popular lithograph.

Alexander died on the Isle of Wight in 1906.

Artwork 

Lady Eveline was also known for her sleighing scenes in art. She was associated with this name due to the winter sleighing scene which was completed in watercolor and is theorized to have been given to the Bells as a keepsake of the "Sleigh Society." She had a tendency to often paint or draw winter scenes. An example of this is one of her drawings of an indigenous man trudging through a snowstorm.

In 1841 through 1849, Lady Eveline joined Sir James Edward Alexander while he was being stationed in London, Ontario during his Canadian tour. During this time her husband was in the 14th Regiment of Foot and aide-de-camp to Sir Benjamin D'Urban and Sir William Rowan. While stationed during the Canadian tour, she created a sketch depicting her surroundings which was of the military steeplechase and was lithographed. This came to be one of her most known works, the first military steeplechase to occur North America in May 1843. It was titled Grand Military Steeple Chase, and is considered to be a rare print. During her time it was a popular collector's item in England.

Her prints can now be found in museums mainly in Canada, where she drew her most famous artwork.

References

External links
 

1821 births
1906 deaths
Canadian women artists
Eveline